The 2009 Grand Prix SAR La Princesse Lalla Meryem was a tennis tournament played on outdoor clay courts. It was the 9th edition of the Grand Prix SAR La Princesse Lalla Meryem, and was on the International category of the 2009 WTA Tour. It took place in Fes, Morocco, from April 27 through May 2, 2008.

Entrants

Seeds

 Rankings as of April 27, 2009.

Other entrants
The following players received wildcards into the main draw:

  Anabel Medina Garrigues
  Nadia Lalami
  Fatima Zahrae El Allami

The following players received entry from the qualifying draw:

  Paula Fondevila Castro
  Corinna Dentoni
  Polona Hercog
  Nathalie Viérin

The following players received entry as a lucky loser:

  Vitalia Diatchenko
  Eva Fernández Brugués

Finals

Singles

 Anabel Medina Garrigues defeated  Ekaterina Makarova, 6–0, 6–1
 It was Medina Garrigues' first title of the year and 9th of her career.

Doubles

 Alisa Kleybanova /  Ekaterina Makarova defeated  Sorana Cîrstea /  Maria Kirilenko, 6–3, 2–6, 10–8

External links
 Official website
 Singles, Doubles and Qualifying Singles Draws

Grand Prix SAR La Princesse Lalla Meryem
Morocco Open
2009 in Moroccan tennis